Scott Lipps is the founder and CEO of Lipps Management in Los Angeles, California.

Early life
Born August 1, son of Barbara and Jerry Lipps, Scott was born and raised in Long Island, NY, where he first enrolled at the Percussion Institute of Technology and would later attend California State University at Northridge.   While in school, Scott also served as the drummer of L.A. band Black Cherry with the original singer from the L.A. Guns, Paul Black.  In 1994 Scott met Mark McCoy (lead vocalist of Outlaw Blood) and recorded a project released on New Breed Records called the New Breed Worship Band with Rick Harchol and Holland Davis. Scott learned management while touring with the band and supplemented his income by working for Lindy Goetz, manager for the Red Hot Chili Peppers. Scott suffered a repetitive arm injury that put an end to his rock career. At the suggestion of his mother, Scott started working for a relative that owned NEXT Model Management. Scott then moved to New York City where he founded One Management in 2001.

Career

Modeling Industry
Scott Lipps started One Management in 2001 which he managed until 2017.  In 2017 he moved to Los Angeles and opened Lipps LA.

Musician
Scott Lipps returned to his musical roots, joining Courtney Love's band Hole as of the 10th Anniversary of One Management's party (September 2011, New York Fashion Week).

Blogger
In 2011, Scott created an influential fashion, music and party blog, www.poplipps.com.  Poplipps is serialized every Friday in Interview Magazine and has been named one of the most influential fashion blogs by tumblr. Poplipps has been featured in Italian Vogue, Spanish Vogue, Spin Magazine and Muse. As the creator of Poplipps, Scott was invited to speak at the Lucky Magazine FABB Conference.

Author
In 2013, Scott decided to create a physical extension of his blog and published his first book called "POPLIPPS: Plus One." His book has been featured in numerous publications, such as: Spanish Vogue, Interview, Nylon, WWD, Purple, the NY Times Magazine, and the NY Observer.

Filmography
In Fall 2011, Scott starred in the E! Entertainment network show "Scouted".

Radio/Podcast Host
In 2018, Scott launched his Dash Radio/Podcast show called Lipps Service

References

External links 

 One Management Website
 Lipps LA Website

American talent agents
Living people
21st-century American politicians
American rock drummers
Feminist musicians
Hole (band) members
Year of birth missing (living people)